Nube Pasajera is the twenty-fifth studio album by La Mafia.  It was released on September 21, 2004. A song titled "No Se Por Que" was to have been the first song on the album, but was not included when the album was released.

Track listing

References

2004 albums
La Mafia albums
Spanish-language albums